The second season of American Ninja Warrior began on December 8, 2010, in Venice Beach, California where 300 competitors took on the course. The 15 semi-finalists moved on to the "Ninja Warrior Boot Camp" in the remote California mountains, where they competed in a series of team challenges. Then, the final moved on to compete in the season finale of American Ninja Warrior 2 as a part of Sasuke 26 at Mount Midoriyama in Japan. The series concluded on January 2, 2011, same as Sasuke 26 was aired in Japan. This season was hosted by Matt Iseman and Jimmy Smith, with G4's Alison Haislip as a sideline reporter.

Notable Competitors
Notable competitors this season included:
 Professional freerunner Levi Meeuwenberg
 Professional freerunner Brent Steffensen
 Former American Gladiator champion and gladiator Evan Dollard
 Former Survivor contestant Ozzy Lusth
 Dutch canoe polo pioneer Nick Duett

Ninja Boot Camp
The 15 competitors who completed the Venice Beach finals course headed to "Ninja Warrior Boot Camp" where they were broken down into three teams: Red Dragons, White Tigers, and Blue Monkeys. From then on, 5 were eliminated from competition and 10 moved onto Mount Midoriyama in Japan to compete in the season finale for a chance to win $250,000 and be the first "American Ninja Warrior".

The 10 finalists earned the chance to compete at Sasuke 26 which aired on January 2, 2011, on G4.

Final 10: In order they received their American flag "colors" (bandanas):

Red Dragons:

White Tigers:

Blue Monkeys:

Mount Midoriyama
None of the competitors were able to complete stage 3, but half (5 out of 10) completed stage 1 and progressed onto stage 2, where 4 out of 5 made it onto stage 3.

Stage 1

* alternate, replaced Levi Meeuwenberg who broke his wrist during a taping of Jump City: Seattle

Stage 2

Stage 3

References

American Ninja Warrior
2010 American television seasons
2011 American television seasons